Ri Kwan-myong (born 13 September 1982) is a North Korean former footballer. He represented North Korea on at least one occasion in 2003.

Career statistics

Club

Notes

International

References

1982 births
Living people
North Korean footballers
North Korea international footballers
Association football midfielders
PFC Krylia Sovetov Samara players
North Korean expatriate footballers
North Korean expatriate sportspeople in Russia
Expatriate footballers in Russia